The Open de Baleares was a European Tour golf tournament which was played annually from 1988 to 1995. It had five names in eight years. It was staged at various courses on Majorca, the largest of the Balearic Islands of Spain. The most notable winner was five times major championship winner Seve Ballesteros, who won three of the first five events. The prize fund in sterling terms peaked at £300,000 in 1993 and by 1995 it was down to £250,000, which was one of the smallest on the European Tour that year.

Winners

External links
Coverage on the European Tour's official site

Former European Tour events
Golf tournaments in Spain
Sport in the Balearic Islands
Recurring sporting events established in 1988
Recurring sporting events disestablished in 1995
Defunct sports competitions in Spain